"Frankie Teardrop" is a song by Suicide from the band's self-titled debut album, released in 1977.

Lyrics and content
The song tells a story of a young father and poverty-stricken factory worker whose destitution drives him to insanity. One day, Frankie comes home from work, murders his wife and child, and then commits suicide. The narrative then continues to follow him into hell. The musical backing on the song is sparse, featuring just a simple keyboard riff, drum machine, and the vocal line, creating a chilling atmosphere. Singer Alan Vega's "dark, inhuman screams" add to the claustrophobic nature of the piece.

Alternate versions
The Alan Vega 70th Birthday Limited Edition EP Series featured two versions of "Frankie Teardrop". The first was a cover by American poet and singer Lydia Lunch, and the other was a previously unreleased 1976 demo of the song titled "Frankie Teardrop vs the Space Alien".

Critical reception
The track has received critical attention due to both its disturbing nature (Nick Hornby in his book 31 Songs described it as something you would listen to "Only once"), and for its political viewpoint, which Allmusic described as "more literally and poetically political than the work of bands who wore their radical philosophies on their sleeve". Bruce Springsteen cited the song as an influence on his album Nebraska. Pitchfork cited it as "[The track that] gets most of the ink" in terms of critical acclaim, and jokingly as "Taxi Driver: The Musical" when citing the album Suicide in its 100 Greatest ’70s Albums list.

Lou Reed once said that he wished that he had written the song.

In popular culture
The frightening nature of the song gave birth to a recurring segment on comedian Tom Scharpling's long-running weekly call-in radio program The Best Show, which is named "The Frankie Teardrop Challenge". Beginning in around 2013, Scharpling challenged fans of the show to listen to the song on headphones as loudly as possible, at nighttime and while alone, in the most creatively terrifying situations that they can think of. Callers regularly phone in to recount their experiences attempting the challenge, with very few listeners completing all 10 minutes and 26 seconds of the song. Scharpling also often works elements of "Frankie Teardrop" into experimental improvisational sound collages that he regularly creates on-air.

Personnel
Adapted from the Suicide liner notes.
Suicide
 Martin Rev – keyboards
 Alan Vega – vocals
Production and additional personnel
 Larry Alexander – engineering
 Craig Leon – production
 Marty Thau – production

References

1977 songs
Existentialist works
Suicide (band) songs
Fictional murderers
Songs written by Alan Vega
Songs written by Martin Rev
Songs about mental health
Songs about suicide